is a passenger railway station in located in the city of Kainan, Wakayama Prefecture, Japan, operated by West Japan Railway Company (JR West).

Lines

Station layout
The station consists of one side platform and one island platform connected to the station building by a footbridge. The station is unattended.

Platforms

Adjacent stations

|-
!colspan=5|West Japan Railway Company (JR West)

History
Kamogō Station opened on February 28, 1924. With the privatization of the Japan National Railways (JNR) on April 1, 1987, the station came under the aegis of the West Japan Railway Company.

Passenger statistics
In fiscal 2019, the station was used by an average of 670 passengers daily (boarding passengers only).

Surrounding Area
 former Shimotsu Town Hall
 
 Kainan City Shimotsu Daini Junior High School
 Wakayama Prefectural Hainan High School Shimotsu Branch School
 Kainan Municipal Hainan Shimotsu High School

See also
List of railway stations in Japan

References

External links

 Kamogō Station Official Site

Railway stations in Wakayama Prefecture
Railway stations in Japan opened in 1924
Kainan, Wakayama